Goban may refer to:

People 
 Saint Gobain or Goban, a 7th-century Irish Benedictine monk
 Saint Goban, a 6th-century Irish Benedictine monk and abbot, brother to Molaise of Leighlin

Game 
 goban, the board used for the game of Go

Theatre 
 Goban, a set of five plays by Tamagusuku Chōkun